Sir John Valentine Wistar Shaw  (14 February 1894 – 24 December 1982) was a British colonial administrator.
Born in Derby on 14 February 1894, Shaw was educated at Repton, and in the First World War did military service from 1914 to 1919.  He then joined the Colonial Administrative Service.

Appointments
Gold Coast
 Assistant District Commissioner, 1921–1925
 District Commissioner, 1925 -1928
 Assistant Secretary, 1928–1935

Palestine
 Assistant Secretary, 1935–1938
 Senior Assistant Secretary, 1938–1939
 Departmental Chief Secretary, 1939–1940

Cyprus
 Colonial Secretary 1940–1943

Palestine
 Chief Secretary 1943

Palestine and Cyprus
 Acting Governor, Cyprus and Acting High Commissioner for Palestine for several periods, 1940–1946.

Trinidad and Tobago
 Governor and Commander-in-Chief, 1947–1950

Death
Shaw died on 24 December 1982 in Hastings, Sussex.

Honours and legacy
His papers are held by the Bodleian Library of Commonwealth and African Studies at Rhodes House, with additional items at the Brotherton Library, University of Leeds.

References

External links
 Portrait at the National Portrait Gallery

1894 births
1982 deaths
Knights Commander of the Order of St Michael and St George
Knights Bachelor
Gold Coast (British colony) people
Mandatory Palestine people
British Cyprus people
Chief secretaries (British Empire)
Governors of British Cyprus
Governors of Trinidad and Tobago
British High Commissioners of Palestine
Chief Secretaries of Palestine
Colonial Secretaries of Cyprus
People from Derby